Carmentina perculta is a species of sedge moth in the genus Carmentina. It was described by Alexey Diakonoff in 1979. It is found in Taiwan.

References

External links
 Carmentina perculta at Zipcodezoo.com

Moths described in 1979
Glyphipterigidae